Devil's Guard, by George Robert Elford and published in 1971, is the story of a former German Waffen-SS officer's string of near-constant combat that begins on World War II's eastern front and continues into the book's focus—the First Indochina War-as an officer in the French Foreign Legion.  The book is presented by the author as non-fiction, but is considered untrue by military historians and is usually sold as fiction. In 2006, the online bookstore AbeBooks reported that it was among the ten novels most frequently sold to American soldiers in Iraq (the only war fiction in the top ten).

Plot
The story is told in the words of "Hans Josef Wagemueller", a former officer in the Waffen-SS during the Second World War. The story begins with the capitulation of Germany in 1945, while Wagemueller is fighting the Soviets and partisans near Czechoslovakia. Wagemueller escapes the Allied powers in post-war Europe by fighting his way west and using underground connections to reach Switzerland, where he joins the French Foreign Legion. Wagemueller reunites with two former sergeants from his former German unit, Bernard Eisner and Erich Schulze, and is sent to French Indochina. 

In Indochina, Wagemueller and his comrades were incorporated into mixed Legion units that included many French territorial troops. However, under the command of French Colonel Simon Houssong, Wagemueller is put in command of an all-German battalion (around 900 troops) composed of former Nazi troops who, like Wagemueller, fled to the Legion. Their mission is to disrupt the Viet Minh in their rear supply areas, far from cities and French-controlled zones. 

For more than three years, the battalion has run a highly successful and brutal guerrilla war against the insurgent Viet Minh across northern Indochina, Laos and southern China. In one such case, "the battalion of the damned" escorts a supply column north through enemy-held territory by forcing Viet Minh prisoners and family members to ride in the column's trucks, tanks and jeeps to ensure safe passage. 
In other situations, poison, torture and natural resources are used.

According to the 1985 edition publisher's note, "This book is being published to provide the reading public with a clear insight into the mind and personality of an unregenerate Nazi, to show the dehumanization of men in war, and to illustrate the ironies and hypocrisies to which men are driven in defense of their actions. The publication of this book in no way indicates that the publisher agrees with or condones the points of view it expresses."

Historicity
It is debatable as to whether the book is merely exaggerated fact or outright fiction. The book is presented by Elford as the words of Wagemueller, who lived in Nepal at the time of the book's publication. In the preamble, Elford claims to have met the man and arranged for him to dictate the events of his military life into a microphone over the course of 18 days. 

It is documented that ex-SS soldiers both joined the French Foreign Legion and fought in the French Indochina War until approximately 1947 when France began to crack down. But there is no evidence to support the book's claim that a battalion-sized unit comprised solely of Germans ever existed.

Elford claims his only contribution to the book is in the capacity of an editor, changing the names of soldiers and military verbiage. Critics point to the fact that much of the military power possessed by the characters is anachronistic. The access to military records should also allow for the exact tracing of units in which Wagemueller and his comrades served, but the name of Wagemueller's unit in eastern Europe, the "21st special partisan-jaeger commando", is mentioned in only Devil's Guard. Supporters point to the fact that Elford is following Wagemueller's request that his details not be made traceable. 

Critics also point to the serialization of the book (it spawned two sequels, despite the fact the original ended towards the end of the war, 700 days from Dien Bien Phu in 1954 according to the narrator).  Wagemueller ends up fighting for the United States later in the series, after spending time in Tibet (his officers in New Caledonia).

Devil's Guard mentions Freddie Spencer Chapman's book The Jungle is Neutral about British commandos fighting behind Japanese lines as a source of reference for the Nazi battalion. Many of the tactics used by Wagemueller's troops were taken directly from The Jungle is Neutral as well as the tactics used by French commando Roger Vanderberghe, commander of Commando 24 of the French GCMA special forces. For instance, Vanderberghe's use of Viet Minh '"pajama" uniforms' to walk right into Viet Minh camps to attack.

Devil's Guard series

1971 Devil's Guard
1988 Devil's Guard II : Recall to Inferno
1991 Devil's Guard III: Unconditional Warfare

Devil's Guard was first published as a hardbound book by Dell (under the Delacorte imprint) in 1971. This was the only DG title released in this format. It was subsequently released as a mass market paperback, originally published by New English Library in the UK in 1972 and reprinted several times thereafter. It was never offered by Dell in the US. All three Devil's Guard books were reprinted by St. Petersburg, Florida's Hailer Publishing in the mid-2000s.

References

1971 books
History books about World War II